A Cheap and Evil Girl is the debut album by singer-songwriter Bree Sharp. It was released by Trauma Records on July 27, 1999. The album peaked at No. 47 on Billboard's Top Heatseekers chart.

Track listing

Personnel 
 Bree Sharp – lead and background vocals, guitar
 Robbie Adams – background vocals
 Simon Austin – guitar, background vocals
 Bret Bass – bass
 Knox Chandler – guitar, bass
 Don DiLego – guitar, bass, piano, percussion, background vocals
 Marko Djordjevic – drums
 Mike Elizondo – bass
 Paul Garisto – drums
 Steve Hamilton – guitar
 Mike Rogers – bass, drums, background vocals
 Winston Roye – bass
 Marty Sarandría – bass
 Kevin Savigar – Hammond organ
 Michael Urbano – drums

References 

Bree Sharp albums
1999 debut albums